No Other Tiger is a 1927 mystery thriller novel by the British writer A.E.W. Mason. Julius Ricardo, who features in the Inspector Hanaud series, briefly appears and Hanaud himself is mentioned in passing.

Synopsis
While tiger hunting in Burma, Colonel John Strickland encounters no tigers but meets a strange man who has news of the woman back in England that Strickland is in love with. His adventures subsequently take him to England and Southern France.

References

Bibliography
 Bargainnier, Earl F. Twelve Englishmen of Mystery. Popular Press, 1984.
 Reilly, John M. Twentieth Century Crime & Mystery Writers. Springer, 2015.

External links
 Full text of No Other Tiger at HathiTrust Digital Library

1927 British novels
Novels by A. E. W. Mason
British mystery novels
British thriller novels
Hodder & Stoughton books
Novels set in India
Novels set in England
Novels set in France
George H. Doran Company books